Ear-hole fried cake is a fried rice cake that is a popular street food in Tianjin, China. It was invented by a street vendor named Liu Wanchun (劉萬春) during the Guangxu Emperor's reign. Ear-hole fried cakes are considered a traditional food of Tianjin and are sold as street food, in restaurants, and commercially.

Traditionally, it is made of fried yellow rice bread. The bread is kneaded, filled with red bean paste, and covered in sugar. The cake is then fried until crispy.

Ear-hole fried cake is often referred to as one of the "Three Tianjin delights", along with Mahua (snack) and Goubuli.

References

External links
"Tianjin Food". China.org.cn.

Street food in China
Tianjin cuisine